The genus Panaque contains a small number of small to medium-sized South American suckermouth armoured catfishes that are notable for being among the very few vertebrates that feed extensively on wood.  In addition, algae and aufwuchs are an important part of the diet, and they use their rasping teeth to scrape this from rocks. These fish are also popular aquarium fish, where the sound of scraping as these fish forage for food is easily audible.

Taxonomy
Scobinancistrus and Panaqolus are sometimes considered to be subgenera of this genus.

Species
There are currently seven recognized species in this genus:
 Panaque armbrusteri 
 Panaque bathyphilus 
 Panaque cochliodon 
 Panaque nigrolineatus  (Royal panaque)
 Panaque schaeferi 
 Panaque suttonorum  (Blue-eye panaque)
 Panaque titan

Etymology
The name Panaque is a Latinisation of a native Venezuelan name for these fish. It is pronounced "pan ack" in Britain and Europe, but often as "pan aki" or "pan a kay" in America. The Japanese call these fish "pana koo ee".

Distribution and habitat 
Panaque are found in the Magdalena River, Orinoco River, Amazon River, Essequibo River, and Lake Maracaibo drainages. All Panaque come from tropical South American and inhabit fast-flowing streams and rivers. They are weak swimmers but like other armoured catfish possess a strong sucker-like mouth with which they can hold on to submerged rocks and wood.

Physical characteristics 

Like other members of the armoured catfish family (Loricariidae), all Panaque have sturdy, armoured bodies covered in toughened plates of skin called scutes. These are not scales; like all catfish, Panaque lack scales. As well their armour, these catfish have very sturdy dorsal and pectoral fin spines. They use these defensively, either to wedge themselves into cracks from which predators cannot pull them, or else to prevent large predators from swallowing them. Another characteristic typical of the armoured catfish family is an iris. Most fish are unable to regulate the amount of light that enters the eye since they have irises that cannot change size. Both male and female Panaque develop bristles, known as odontodes, on the side of head immediately before and onto the pectoral fins.

Unlike predatory catfish, these omnivorous catfish have very short barbels. These barbels can be seen in the photograph of mouth of a Panaque shown here; they are the short pointed structures on either side of a suckermouth. This sucker-like mouth allows them to attach to rocks and remain stationary with very little expenditure of energy.

Xylophagy (wood consumption and digestion)

Along with the species of the Hypostomus cochliodon group (formerly the genus Cochliodon), it has been argued that Panaque are the only fish that can eat and digest wood. Possible adaptations to consuming wood include spoon-shaped, scraper-like teeth and highly angled jaws to chisel wood. Researchers have also identified symbiotic gut bacteria that may allow the fish to digest the wood they consume. However, others have argued that Panaque do not in fact digest wood, and in fact take up very little energy from the wood they consume and actually lose weight when fed just wood. Furthermore, their digestive tracts are no different from those of related catfish and they do not hold wood particles in the gut longer than other catfish, suggesting Panaque are not physically adapted to eating wood, and are in fact detritivores much like other Loricariidae. In September 2010 scientists from the US National Science Foundation claimed to have discovered a new species of wood-eating catfish in the Alto Purús National Park, Peru.

In the aquarium
Several species of Panaque have become popular aquarium fish. The brightly coloured Panaque nigrolineatus is particularly popular and is known as the "royal panaque" or "royal pleco", monikers which reflect its comparative costliness and beauty over the common pleco. Royal plecos have a greyish-green base color against which thick, dark bluish-black stripes are set; their fins are edged with gold or cream, and their eyes are red. In captivity, royal plecos typically grow to around 30 centimeters in length.

A second species, Panaque cochliodon, is familiar to many aquarists as the "blue-eyed pleco". Though the blue-eyed pleco was widely traded in the late 1980s and early 1990s, it is now only rarely exported from its native Colombia. It is also associated with the binomina Panaque suttonorum and P. suttoni, though Panaque suttonorum is a different fish which only comes from Venezuela. Blue-eyed plecos reach a similar size to royal plecos, but because many specimens are infected with a bacterium closely related to Rickettsia, mortality immediately after import can be high. However, once they have settled in and begun feeding, they are no more difficult to keep than royal plecos.

All Panaque catfish require much the same care in captivity. Panaque mainly demand a mixed diet including green algae, fresh vegetables such as carrots, courgettes, and spinach, but because they are argued to be xylophagous, many aquarists provide driftwood for them to graze upon, as well. The meaty foods enjoyed by other plecos are not required. Because they are relatively big for aquarium fish and produce an unusually large amount of waste, a high-capacity tank and filter are essential. Royal panaques tolerate a wider range of water chemistry than others—they prefer somewhat soft, slightly acid water but they will tolerate hard, alkaline water.

In terms of behavior, Panaque are peaceful and nocturnal bottom-dwellers which make good residents in community tanks. Like most of the other armored catfish, they are territorial, and groups should only be kept in very large tanks.

See also
List of freshwater aquarium fish species

References

External links
 
Panaque Research Studies on the wood eating loricariid catfishes

Ancistrini
Catfish of South America
Catfish genera
Freshwater fish genera
Fishkeeping
Herbivorous vertebrates
Taxa named by Carl H. Eigenmann
Taxa named by Rosa Smith Eigenmann